Pope Clement V (r. 1305–14) created 24 cardinals in three consistories held during his pontificate. He also named his future successor Pope John XXII as a cardinal in 1312.

15 December 1305
Pierre de la Chapelle Taillefert
Bérenger Frédol seniore
Arnaud de Canteloup
Pierre Arnaud de Puyanne O.S.B.
Thomas of Jorz O.P.
Nicolas de Fréauville O.P.
Etienne de Suisy
Arnaud de Pellegrue
Raymond de Got
Guillaume Arrufat des Forges

19 December 1310
Arnaud de Falguières
Bertrand des Bordes
Arnaud Nouvel O.Cist.
Raymond Guillaume des Forges
Bernard de Garves

23 December 1312
King Philippe IV asked the pope to offer the cardinalate to Bishop of Utrecht Guy d'Avesnes the in 1312 though the bishop declined the elevation when the pope extended the offer to him.
Guillaume de Mandagout Can. Reg. O.S.A.
Arnaud d'Aux
Jacques d'Euse
Bérenguer de Frédol iuniore
Michel du Bec-Crespin
Guillaume Teste
Guillaume Pierre Godin O.P.
Vital du Four O.F.M.
Raymond O.S.B.

Notes and references

Sources

College of Cardinals
Clement V
 Cle
Pope Clement V